Sinhalisation is a term, derived from Sinhala, that has number of meanings in Sri Lanka. it is mainly the  assimilation into Sinhalese Culture in which the members of an ethno-cultural group  are steadily integrated  or  "absorbed" into  established  Sinhalese culture.

Sociological
In a sociological context it could refer to the assimilation of ethno-cultural minorities in Sri Lanka such as the Sri Lankan Tamils, Colombo Chetties and indigenous Veddas into the majority Sinhalese identity, including some Sinhala Buddhists of the interior such as the Demalagattara and some Catholics such as the Bharatha of the coastal areas of the island nation.

Many noted elite  families that had contributed to Sinhala nationalism had been of Tamil origin, Sinhalised in the recent past. (see abstract here)

Political
In a political context it could refer to the Sinhala language-favouring policies of the post colonial governments of Sri Lanka  that is considered to be a major cause  of the Sri Lankan civil war. It is termed as culturo-ideological exclusivism by some when one's cultural values and norms are absolutised in such a manner that a particular way of life is enshrined as superior to all others and must therefore be adopted by others (e.g. the Tamil reaction to the perceived "Sinhalisation" processes of the Sri Lankan state)

It was said to be a cause of the abortive coup by disgruntled Catholic army officers in 1962.

Currently some observers note that Sri Lankan political parties such as JHU and JVP adhere to a policy of political Sinhalisation.

Other meanings
Medias use the word "Sinhalisation" to refer to the process by which the Sri Lankan government funded and sponsored settlement of Sinhala people in Tamil-dominant regions in order to make Tamil as minorities. Some reports claims that the Sinhalese and Sinhala military families are settled in houses built by money from the Indian government that was intended to improve the welfare of the Tamil people.

Notes

 

The ancestor of the Bandaranayke family was a 17th-century Tamil immigrant Pandaram; a non-Brahmin priest known as Neelaperumal Kalukapuge. The term 'Kalu' in Tamil is different in meaning to the Sinhalese meaning.

A similar process was witnessed in the Kandyan kingdom, where for example the ancestor of Pilimatalavuva Maha Adikaram and related families trace or claim ancestry from a Pandyan emperor of the late 17th century, though the Pandyan kingdom had seized to exist by the 15th century and the region was ruled by the Madurai Sultanate, the Vijayanagara Empire and the Nayak dynasties.

See also
Sri Lankan Mudaliyars
Bharatakula
Demalagattara
Negombo Tamils
Kandyan Convention

References

External links
Sinhalization of the Vanni Mainland
Colombo Telegraph
Sinhalisation of a coastal village in Puttalam district
Sinhalisation of the Vedda community
Kandya Convention signatories

Cultural assimilation
Sri Lankan Tamil culture
British Ceylon period
Political history of Sri Lanka